The Meyerhofer Cobblestone House is located in Lake Geneva, Wisconsin.

History
The house originally belonged to German immigrant Nikolaus Meyerhofer. Meyerhofer built it out of stones gathered by his daughters. It was listed on the National Register of Historic Places in 1980 and on the State Register of Historic Places in 1989.

References

Houses on the National Register of Historic Places in Wisconsin
National Register of Historic Places in Walworth County, Wisconsin
Houses in Walworth County, Wisconsin
Colonial architecture in the United States
Greek Revival architecture in Wisconsin
Cobblestone architecture